The 1934 Irish Greyhound Derby known as the National Derby at the time took place during August and September with the final being held at Harold's Cross Stadium in Dublin.

The 1934 Irish Derby was finally awarded to Harold's Cross on condition that they contributed a minimum of £100 towards the event. The ICC added a further £50. It was also agreed that Shelbourne Park and Harold's Cross would run the competition in alternate years.

The winner Frisco Hobo was owned by Tim Fennin.

Final result 
At Harolds Cross (over 525 yards):

Distances 
1, 3, short-head

Competition Report
There were nine first round heats with the first two from each qualifying for the semi finals. Kerryhill Boy won the first semi by six lengths from My Mistake in a time of 30.32 sec. Buzzing Dick won the second by half a length from April Dandy in 30.28 and the final semi went to Seldom At Home four lengths ahead of Frisco Hobo in 30.75. In the final the outsider Frisco Hobo took the lead at the second bend and held of a late challenge by Buzzing Dick.

See also

1934 UK & Ireland Greyhound Racing Year

References

Greyhound Derby
Irish Greyhound Derby
Irish Greyhound Derby
Greyhound racing competitions in Dublin (city)